The Assistant Secretary of State for Legislative Affairs is the head of the Bureau of Legislative Affairs within the United States Department of State.

List of Assistant Secretaries of State for Legislative Affairs

External links
List of Assistant Secretaries of State for Legislative Affairs by the State Department Historian
Bureau of Legislative Affairs Website

References